James Carney may refer to:

 James Carney (scholar) (1914–1989), Irish Celtic studies scholar
 James Carney (bishop) (1915–1990), Archbishop of the Roman Catholic Archdiocese of Vancouver
 James Carney (American priest) (1924–1983), American priest in Honduras during the civil war
 Jim Carney (poet) (born 1950), Irish poet
 Jay Carney (James Carney, born 1965), White House Press Secretary
 James Carney (cyclist) (born 1968), American Olympic cyclist, founder of C.A.R.E. for Cycling, Inc.
 James Carney, actor in Said O'Reilly to McNab

See also
 Jem Carney (1856–1941), English boxer